Slovenski Top Model, Season 1 was the first season of a reality documentary based on Tyra Banks America's Next Top Model that pits contestants from Slovenia against each other in a variety of competitions to determine who will win title of the next Slovene Top Model and a lucrative modelling contract with Alen Kobilica Models agency, a spread in the Slovenian issue of Elle, car Seat Ibiza, the winner will also become face of Maybeline New York for Slovenia, she will receive mobile package Orto Muziq for 2 years and hopes of a successful future in the modeling business.

The first season was hosted by Slovene model Nuša Šenk. Judging panelists were Irena Lušičić, Milan Gačanovič, Petra Windschnurer, Zoran. Girls were allowed to audition between the ages of 16 to 27 and have to be taller than 170 cm (5' 7"). Auditions have been held in the seven biggest cities of Slovenia (Maribor, Ljubljana, Kranj, Celje, Novo Mesto, Nova Gorica, and Koper).

On December 22, 16-year-old Maja Fučak from Koper was crowned the first winner of Slovenski Top Model over 22 year old Tina Grebenšek after both walked on a fashion show in Belgrade. Despite landing in the bottom two at the very first judging, Fučak beat 13 of her fellow competitors.

Contestants

Summaries

Call-out order

 The contestant was eliminated
 The contestant quit the competition
 The contestant was the original eliminee but was saved
 The contestant was part of a non-elimination bottom two
 The contestant won the competition

In episode 1, the pool of 22 girls was reduced to the final 14 who would move on to the main competition. This first call-out does not reflect their performance.
In episode 3, Lejla quit the competition. Therefore, there was no elimination that episode.
In episode 7, Kamila quit the competition. Therefore, there was no elimination that episode.

Photo Shoot Guide
Episode 1 photo shoot: Swimwear (casting)
Episode 2 photo shoot: Fairies in mountains
Episode 3 photo shoot: Maybelline beauty shoot
Episode 4 photo shoot: Naked in golden water
Episode 5 photo shoot: Hollywood divas
Episode 6 photo shoot: Futuristic underwater   
Episode 7 photo shoot: Orto babes for Simobil
Episode 8 photo shoot: Protective sisters with babies
Episode 9 photo shoot: High fashion with chairs and snakes in 3D
Episode 10 photo shoot: Greek kiss for S.oliver
Episode 11 photo shoot: Fishing village in Italy
Episode 12 photo shoot: Lingerie 
Episode 13 photo shoot: A high fashion story editorial
Episode 14 photo shoot: Elle cover shots

Controversy
After being elimination from the show Samanta Škrjanec was accused of hosting a scam beauty pageant called Miss Eco by competitors as well as a scam modelling agency. It was also discovered that she was hosting an erotic quiz at the age of 19.

References

Top Model
2010 Slovenian television seasons